Cho Yi-hyun (born December 8, 1999) is a South Korean actress who made her acting debut in 2017. Her most notable portrayals include Hospital Playlist (2020–2021), School 2021 (2021–2022), and All of Us Are Dead (2022).

Career 
Cho made her acting debut in 2017. She signed an exclusive contract with JYP Entertainment in 2018, but the following year, she moved to Artist Company.

Filmography

Film

Television series

Web series

Music videos appearances

Awards and nominations

Listicles

References

External links

 
 

21st-century South Korean actresses
South Korean film actresses
South Korean television actresses
South Korean web series actresses
Living people
1999 births
JYP Entertainment artists
Hanlim Multi Art School alumni